is the 21st studio album by Japanese entertainer Miho Nakayama. Released through King Records on September 16, 1999, it is the seventh studio release (after One and Only, Mind Game, Merry Merry, Dé eaya, Wagamama na Actress, and Olive) to not feature a single. Manifesto features the three-member musical unit Little Creatures. This was Nakayama's last studio album until Neuf Neuf in 2019.

The album peaked at No. 29 on Oricon's albums chart and sold over 12,000 copies.

Track listing 
All lyrics are written by Miho Nakayama, except where indicated; all music is arranged by Little Creatures.

Personnel
 Miho Nakayama – vocals
 Little Creatures
 Takuji Aoyagi – guitar, bass, percussion
 Masato Suzuki – synthesizer programming, keyboards, bass, percussion
 Tsutomu Kurihara – drums, percussion, guitar
 Chieko Kimbara – violin (4)
 Tatsuya Murayama – viola (4)
 Tatsuya Shimogami – flugelhorn (4)
 Taqur Francia – backing vocals (4)

Charts

References

External links
 
 
 

1999 albums
Miho Nakayama albums
Japanese-language albums
King Records (Japan) albums